George Saunders is an American short story writer and professor at Syracuse University.

George Saunders may also refer to:

 George Saunders (athlete) (1907–1996), member of the English 4×110 yards relay team
 G. K. Saunders (1910–2005), New Zealand radio and TV writer
 George Saunders (British wrestler), British Olympic wrestler
 George Saunders (Canadian wrestler) (born 1949), Canadian former wrestler
 George Saunders (footballer, born 1918) (1918–1982), English football player for Everton
 George Saunders (footballer, born 1989), English football player
 George Lethbridge Saunders (1807–1863), English painter
 George Saunders (Royal Navy officer) (c. 1671–1734), naval officer, official and politician

See also
 George Rideout (born 1945), full name George Saunders Rideout
 George Sanders (disambiguation)
 Hilary Saint George Saunders (1898–1951), British author